The Ministry of Economy of Argentina is the country's state treasury and a ministry of the national executive power that manages economic policy.

The Ministry of Economy is one of the oldest ministries in the Argentine government, having existed continuously since the formation of the first Argentine executive in 1854, in the presidency of Justo José de Urquiza – albeit under the name of Ministry of the Treasury. The current minister responsible is Sergio Massa, who has served since 2022 in the cabinet of Alberto Fernández.

Headquarters

The Argentine Ministry of the Treasury has, since the building's 1939 inaugural, been based in a 14-story Rationalist office building designed by local architect Carlos Pibernat. The Economy Ministry building was built on a 0.57 ha (1.4 ac) Montserrat neighborhood lot facing the Casa Rosada presidential office building to the north, and the Defense Ministry (Libertador Building) to the easta government building also designed by Pibernat.

The building's lobby was decorated with murals painted by the architect's brother, Antonio Pibernat, a post-impressionist painter influenced by the naturalist Barbizon School.

The post has existed on a formal basis since the 1826 inaugural of Bernardino Rivadavia, who named lawmaker Salvador María del Carril as the nation's first official Ministro de Hacienda. The office became among the most powerful in Argentine Government during the generation after 1880, when English Argentine investment, foreign trade, and immigration spurred development. Customs collections (source of over half of public revenues at the time) and the Central Bank were among the responsibilities placed under the Economy Ministry's aegis, and successive ministers' policies were often enacted through presidential decrees.

Its influence grew further when it absorbed the cabinet post of Minister of Public Works in 1991, to help facilitate Economy Minister Domingo Cavallo's privatizations initiative, and, in turn, divested oversight over the nation's goods-producing sectors with the 2008 designation of the Production Ministry by President Cristina Kirchner, in a bid to improve strained relations with the country's agrarian sector following the 2008 Argentine government conflict with the agricultural sector over export tariffs.

The Ministry of the Treasury was appropriated a US$1.7 billion operational budget in 2009, and employed over 4,000 staffers.

List of ministers

Notes

See also
Argentina
Economy of Argentina

References

External links 
 
 Gobierno Electrónico website (archived)

Economy
Argentina
Argentina
Economy of Argentina
Anti-dumping authorities
Buildings and structures in Buenos Aires
Government buildings in Argentina
Finance in Argentina
1854 establishments in Argentina
Argentina